Charles Lee Benante (born November 27, 1962) is an American musician best known as the drummer for thrash metal band Anthrax, and crossover thrash band Stormtroopers of Death. Alongside rhythm guitarist and band leader Scott Ian, Benante has composed the majority of the music throughout Anthrax's discography. He joined the reunited Pantera in 2022, replacing original drummer Vinnie Paul, who died in 2018.

Career 
Benante joined Anthrax in 1983, prior to the recording of the band's debut album Fistful of Metal, and has been the band's drummer ever since. He is known for having a very fast double kick technique and has been credited as one of the pioneers of double-bass, as well as with popularizing the blast beat technique with thrash metal.

He is also an accomplished guitarist, having contributed lead guitar to S.O.D.'s Speak English or Die album. Along with his musician duties, Benante is also a graphic artist and has created many of Anthrax's album covers and T-shirt designs.

In 2021, Benante released a solo album entitled Silver Linings. Paul Stenning referred to the album as "a very worthy memento of attacking a crazy year with a positive outlook."

On July 14, 2022, it was announced that Benante had joined the reunited Pantera by filling in for original drummer, and his close friend, Vinnie Paul.

Personal life
Benante is the uncle of Anthrax bassist Frank Bello, whose mother is Benante's older sister. His other nephew, Bello's younger brother, Anthony, was murdered in the Bronx, NYC, on March 25, 1996. To the grief of Benante, the murder was never solved.

Benante has stated in most of the old Anthrax interviews and videos that his favorite fictional character is Darth Vader.

Benante is an avid fan of the 1975 film Jaws, and owns a sizeable collection of the film's merchandise. He was featured in the documentary The Shark Is Still Working, which was included on the Jaws 2012 Blu-ray release.

Throughout the course of 2012, Benante faced several personal issues that forced him to miss several concerts with Anthrax. Early on in the year his mother died, which also resulted in Frank Bello (Benante's mother being Bello's grandmother) taking some time off during the band's tour in Argentina. Benante stepped out again during the summer's Rockstar Mayhem Fest run after suffering a "minor hand injury". Also during the summer, Benante was involved in a domestic dispute with his wife in front of his daughter which had them both arrested. Benante later missed the band's UK and European tour in order to take care of "personal stuff" according to Scott Ian. In 2013, it was announced that Benante would be sitting out Australian tour dates, also for personal reasons. Concern was raised in 2012 by MetalSucks over Benante's well-being and future with the band.
In March 2019, it was confirmed that Benante was dating Butcher Babies frontwoman Carla Harvey.

In 2020, Benante had a cameo in the music video for "Everything She Wants," a Wham!-cover performed by Alien Ant Farm.

Equipment

Benante uses and endorses Tama drums and hardware, Paiste cymbals, Vic Firth sticks, Evans Drumheads, and Roland electronics.

Prior to switching to Tama's Speed Cobra pedals in 2010, Benante was one of the few drummers who used Tama's HP35 Camco chain-drive pedals, equipment he had used since 1984.

Discography

Solo

Stormtroopers of Death albums

Stormtroopers of Death videos

With Anthrax

Others
 Liquid Trio Experiment 2 – When the Keyboard Breaks: Live in Chicago (guest drums)

References

External links

 Charlie Benante official website (archived)
 Anthrax official website

1962 births
Living people
American heavy metal drummers
Anthrax (American band) members
Musicians from the Bronx
20th-century American drummers
American male drummers
Stormtroopers of Death members
American people of Italian descent